Llyn Llydaw (from the Welsh meaning Brittany lake) is a natural lake in Snowdonia National Park on the flanks of Snowdon, Wales' highest mountain. This long thin lake has formed in a cwm about one-third of the way up the mountain. It is one of the most visited lakes in the United Kingdom. Thousands of people every year visit Snowdon and many walk past this lake on the Miners' Track.

History 
Llyn Llydaw is the largest of the three lakes on Snowdon's eastern flank.  Higher up lies Glaslyn, and lower down lies Llyn Teyrn.

In 1905, a  pipeline was built from the lake into the valley below. The pipeline and power station continue to operate in 2019.

Popular culture 
The lake featured in Robson Green's Wild Swimming Adventure (ITV December 2009), chosen because it is claimed to be the coldest lake in Britain.  Green's website states that the water was 7° Celsius.

References

External links 

www.geograph.co.uk : photos of Llyn Llydaw and surrounding area

Beddgelert
Llydaw
Tourism in Gwynedd
Llydaw
Tourism in Snowdonia